Maragum may refer to either of two languages of Papua New Guinea:
Mara-Gomu language
Maragam language